Frank O'Rourke (October 16, 1916 – April 27, 1989) was an American writer known for western and mystery novels and sports fiction. O'Rourke wrote more than 60 novels and numerous magazine articles.

Born in Denver, Colorado, he attended Kemper Military School.  A very talented amateur baseball player, he considered trying out for a professional team, but was called up for service in World War II. By the end of the war he had decided to become a writer; his first novel was E Company (1945), based in part on his wartime experiences. O'Rourke dedicated the book to Max Brand, whom he knew before the war. In the book O'Rourke named a fictional war correspondent Max Hastings after him.

Several of O'Rourke's  novels were filmed; The Bravados (1958) was the first, and his novel A Mule for the Marquesa was made into a popular movie named The Professionals (1966). The Great Bank Robbery was filmed in 1969. He married artist Edith Carlson.

Later in life, O'Rourke turned to writing children's literature. A long-time sufferer of bronchial asthma, and made even more ill by the large doses of steroids he was required to take for control of the ailment, he committed suicide on April 27, 1989. His wife died on May 21, 2007.

Notes

Sources
 author and book info.com
 Edith Carlson O'Rourke

References
 O'ROURKE, Frank. Contemporary Authors. 118:361-364. 1986.

External links
 Inventory of the Frank O'Rourke Papers (Accn 1201) at the J. Willard Marriott Library at the University of Utah
 Frank O'Rourke Photograph Collection

American crime fiction writers
Western (genre) writers
1916 births
1989 deaths
20th-century American novelists
American male novelists
20th-century American male writers
1989 suicides